In algebraic geometry, a Fano surface is a surface of general type (in particular, not a Fano variety) whose points index the lines on a non-singular cubic threefold.

Hodge diamond:

Fano surfaces are perhaps the simplest and most studied examples of irregular surfaces of general type that are not related to a product of two curves and are not a complete intersection of divisors in an Abelian variety.

The Fano surface S of a smooth cubic threefold F into P4 carries many remarkable geometric properties.
The surface S is naturally embedded into the grassmannian of lines G(2,5) of P4. Let U be the restriction to S of the universal rank 2 bundle on G. We have the:

Tangent bundle Theorem (Fano, Clemens-Griffiths, Tyurin): The tangent bundle of S is isomorphic to U.

This is a quite interesting result because, a priori, there should be no link between these two bundles. It has many powerful applications. By example, one can recover the fact that the cotangent space of S is generated by global sections. This space of global 1-forms can be identified with the space of global sections of the tautological line bundle O(1) restricted to the cubic F and moreover:

Torelli-type Theorem :  Let g' be the natural morphism from S to the grassmannian G(2,5) defined by the cotangent sheaf of S generated by its 5-dimensional space of global sections. Let F' be the union of the lines corresponding to g'(S). The threefold F' is isomorphic to F.

Thus knowing a Fano surface S, we can recover the threefold F.
By the Tangent Bundle Theorem, we can also understand geometrically the invariants of S:

a) Recall that the second Chern number of a rank 2 vector bundle on a surface is the number of zeroes of a generic section. For a Fano surface S, a 1-form w defines also a hyperplane section {w=0} into P4 of the cubic F. The zeros of the generic w on S corresponds bijectively to the numbers of lines into the smooth cubic surface intersection of {w=0} and F, therefore we recover that the second Chern class of S equals 27.

b) Let w1, w2 be two 1-forms on S. The canonical divisor K on S associated to the canonical form w1 ∧ w2 parametrizes the lines on F that cut the plane P={w1=w2=0} into P4. Using w1 and w2 such that the intersection of P and F is the union of 3 lines, one can recover the fact that K2=45.
Let us give some details of that computation:
By a generic point of the cubic F goes 6 lines. Let s be a point of S and let Ls be the corresponding line on the cubic F. Let Cs be the divisor on S parametrizing lines that cut the line Ls. The self-intersection of Cs is equal to the intersection number of Cs and Ct for t a generic point. The intersection of Cs and Ct is the set of lines on F that cuts the disjoint lines Ls and Lt. Consider the linear span of Ls and Lt : it is an hyperplane into P4 that cuts F into a smooth cubic surface. By well known results on a cubic surface, the number of lines that cuts two disjoints lines is 5, thus we get (Cs) 2 =Cs Ct=5.
As K is numerically equivalent to 3Cs, we obtain K 2 =45.

c) The natural composite map: S -> G(2,5) -> P9 is the canonical map of S. It is an embedding.

See also
 Hodge theory

References

Algebraic surfaces
Complex surfaces